Zimcelebs is a Zimbabwean celebrity news social media-based blog.

Background
Zimcelebs was founded in February 2017 as Zimcelebs TV by Lewis John. John was running a nightclub in South Africa then and he engaged Tafadzwa Gondo who was a freelance journalist to become a partner, the duo revealed that the Zimcelebs idea was inspired by The Shade Room. Over the years, the platform has become one of Zimbabwe's portals for celebrity breaking news and the social media based blog has accumulated a significant following. In March 2021, Zimcelebs was listed as the 6th most influential social media platform in Zimbabwe with the highest engagement percentage and has about 7 million views on YouTube.

Since 2019, Zimcelebs has launched a number of online programmes where musical artists go for live performances which are Ndipe Mic 2019, Bhazi reMangoma 2020, Garage Sessions 2021 and MaChillz. These sessions have hosted top artists like Alick Macheso, Enzo Ishall, Tocky Vibes, Poptain, Stunner, Jah Signal, Winky D , Mudiwa Hood, Kikky Badass, Seh Calaz, Nutty O, Bazooker, Holy Ten, Baba Harare. In 2020, Passion Java Records launched Garamumba which was the first Zimbabwean lockdown online performances session, and it was launched and streamed on Zimcelebs social media from part one to part seven. The segments averaged 300,000 to 500,000 views per session.

Recognition

Zim Glam Awards 2018 – Best Online Media
Changamire Festival Awards 2019 – Best Online Media
Zimdancehall Awards 2019 – Best Online Media
National Arts Merit Awards 2020 – Outstanding Online Media nomination
Zimbabwe Achievers Awards 2020 – Simba Mhere category for best online platform winner 2020
Changamire Festival Awards 2021 – Best Brand Supporting Hip Hop

References 

Social media
Celebrity fandom